Ruswahl Samaai (born 25 September 1991) is a South African track and field athlete who competes in the long jump. He was the bronze medallist in the event at the 2014 and the 2018 Commonwealth Games.
In 2017 he won the bronze medal in the long jump event at the World Championships held in London.

Career
Samaai grew up in a poor neighbourhood of Paarl, living in a shack with his mother. He was driven to compete in athletics and would regularly walk nearly ten kilometres to the local running track to train. He attended Paarl Gimnasium and went on to study transport management at the University of Johannesburg.
 
He made his first impact on the national scene as a 19-year-old at the 2011 South African Championships. He improved in 2012 winning the national under-23 championships in a best of  before repeating his third place at the senior championships. He repeated as universities runner-up in 2013 and added two further centimetres to his best.

Samaai began 2014 with an early world-leading performance of  – a new personal best and his first leap over eight metres. He cleared  in March, placing second to Irving Saladino in the world rankings. At the South African Championships, he came in second place behind Zarck Visser with a near-eight-metre jump. Samaai began competing on the international track and field circuit that year. He had his first podium finish on the Diamond League circuit shortly after, placing third at the Adidas Grand Prix. After that, he was second at the Folksam Grand Prix in Sweden and won at the Meeting Sport Solidarieta in Italy. Samaai was selected to represent South Africa at the 2014 Commonwealth Games and on his international debut, he cleared  in the long jump final to earn the bronze medal.

Personal life

Samaai married long term girlfriend Alecha Thops on the 3rd of October 2021.

Personal bests
Long jump –  (2017)
Triple jump –  (2014)

International competition record

References

External links

Living people
1991 births
Sportspeople from Paarl
South African male long jumpers
Commonwealth Games bronze medallists for South Africa
Athletes (track and field) at the 2014 Commonwealth Games
Athletes (track and field) at the 2018 Commonwealth Games
Commonwealth Games medallists in athletics
World Athletics Championships athletes for South Africa
Athletes (track and field) at the 2016 Summer Olympics
Olympic athletes of South Africa
World Athletics Championships medalists
African Championships in Athletics winners
IAAF Continental Cup winners
South African Athletics Championships winners
Athletes (track and field) at the 2020 Summer Olympics
20th-century South African people
21st-century South African people
Medallists at the 2018 Commonwealth Games